The Beardmore Inflexible, also known as the Rohrbach Ro VI, was a three-engined all-metal prototype bomber aircraft built by William Beardmore and Company at Dalmuir, Scotland.

Design and development

William Beardmore and Company had acquired a licence for the use of the Rohrbach principle for stressed-skin construction. Using these principles and drawings supplied by Rohrbach for the RoVI, the Beardmore company built a massive all-metal three-engined transport, the Beardmore Inflexible.

The aircraft was built in sections at Dalmuir between 1925 and 1927 which were shipped by sea to Felixstowe and from there delivered by road to the Aeroplane & Armament Experimental Establishment (A&AEE) at Martlesham Heath Airfield where it first flew on 5 March 1928. It appeared at the Hendon RAF Display later in the year. The aircraft was structurally advanced for its time and had good flying qualities. It was also a very large aircraft for the time, having a wingspan of  - around  greater than the Boeing B-29 Superfortress heavy bomber of World War II. However, with an all up weight of  it was underpowered and, with no interest forthcoming from the RAF for a production contract, the aircraft was dismantled at Martlesham Heath in 1930. It was then examined for the effects of corrosion on light-alloy stressed skin structures.

One of the aircraft's wheels survives, and is on exhibit in the Science Museum, London.

Operators

Royal Air Force

Specifications

See also

References

Notes

Bibliography

External links

Film clip of the Inflexible taxiing and taking off at the Norwich Air Display, May 1929; Pathé News online archive.

1920s British military transport aircraft
1920s British experimental aircraft
Inflexible
Trimotors
High-wing aircraft
Aircraft first flown in 1928